Cheick Diabaté may refer to:

 Cheick Diabaté (footballer, born 1988), Malian international footballer, full name Cheick Tidiane Diabaté
 Cheick Diabate (footballer, born 2002), English footballer
 Cheick Hamala Diabaté, Malian musician
 Cheick Omar Diabate, Nigerian football manager